Konradswaldau may refer to:

 Kondratów, Świdnica County, Lower Silesian Voivodeship, Poland
 Mrowiny, Jawor County, Lower Silesian Voivodeship, Poland